Flight 6780 may refer to two aircraft crashes:

 American Airlines Flight 6780
 Loganair Flight 6780

6780